Oprah's Book Club was a book discussion club segment of the American talk show The Oprah Winfrey Show, highlighting books chosen by host Oprah Winfrey. Winfrey started the book club in 1996, selecting a new book, usually a novel, for viewers to read and discuss each month. In total, the club recommended 70 books during its 15 years.

Due to the book club's widespread popularity, many obscure titles have become very popular bestsellers, increasing sales in some cases by as many as several million copies. Al Greco, a Fordham University marketing professor, estimated the total sales of the 70 "Oprah editions" at over 55 million copies.

The club has seen several literary controversies, such as Jonathan Franzen's public dissatisfaction with his novel, The Corrections, having been chosen by Winfrey, and the incident of James Frey's memoir, A Million Little Pieces, being outed as almost entirety fabricated. The latter controversy resulted in Frey and publisher Nan Talese being confronted and publicly shamed by Winfrey in a highly praised live televised episode of Winfrey's show.

On June 1, 2012, Oprah announced the launch of Oprah's Book Club 2.0 with Wild by Cheryl Strayed. The new version of Oprah's Book Club, a joint project between OWN: The Oprah Winfrey Network and O, The Oprah Magazine, will incorporate the use of various social media platforms and e-readers.

On March 25, 2019, Apple Inc. and Oprah announced a revival of Oprah's Book Club that aired on Apple TV+.

History
The book club's first selection on September 17, 1996, was the then recently published novel The Deep End of the Ocean by Jacquelyn Mitchard. Winfrey discontinued the book club for one year in 2002, stating that she could not keep up with the required reading while still searching for contemporary novels that she enjoyed. After its revival in 2003, books were selected on a more limited basis (three or four a year).

Winfrey returned to fiction with her 2007 selections of The Road by Cormac McCarthy in March and Middlesex by Jeffrey Eugenides in June. Shortly after its being chosen, The Road was awarded the Pulitzer Prize for Fiction. Winfrey conducted the first ever television interview with McCarthy, a famously reclusive author, on June 5, 2007.

The October 2007 selection was Love in the Time of Cholera, a 1985 novel by Nobel Prize laureate Gabriel García Márquez, greatly furthering not only the influence of the author in North America, but that of his translator Edith Grossman. Another work by Márquez, One Hundred Years of Solitude, was a previous selection for the book club in 2004.

The last club selection was a special edition of Charles Dickens' A Tale of Two Cities and Great Expectations. It had disappointingly low sales figures.

Influence
In Reading with Oprah: The Book Club That Changed America, Kathleen Rooney describes Winfrey as "a serious American intellectual who pioneered the use of electronic media, specifically television and the Internet, to take reading—a decidedly non-technological and highly individual act—and highlight its social elements and uses in such a way to motivate millions of erstwhile non-readers to pick up books."

Business Week stated:
Perhaps the most astonishing aspect of the Oprah phenomenon is how outsized her power is compared with that of other market movers. Some observers suggest that Jon Stewart of Comedy Central's The Daily Show could be No. 2. Other proven arm-twisters include Fox News's Sean Hannity, National Public Radio's Terry Gross, radio personality Don Imus, and CBS' 60 Minutes. But no one comes close to Oprah's clout: Publishers estimate that her power to sell a book is anywhere from 20 to 100 times that of any other media personality.

In 2009, it was reported that the influence of Winfrey's book club had even spread to Brazil, with picks like A New Earth dominating Brazil's best-seller list.

The club generated so much success for some books that they went on to be adapted into films.  This subset includes The Deep End of the Ocean and The Reader.

At the show's conclusion in May 2011, Nielsen BookScan created a list of the top-10 bestsellers from the club's final 10 years (prior data was unavailable). The top four with sales figures as of May 2011:

Eckhart Tolle, A New Earth (2005), 3,370,000 copies
James Frey, A Million Little Pieces, 2,695,500 copies
Elie Wiesel, Night, 2,021,000 copies
Cormac McCarthy, The Road, 1,385,000 copies

In a 2014 paper by economist Craig L. Garthwaite published in American Economic Journal: Applied Economics, it was reported that while the book club increased sales of individual titles in the list, it caused a short-term overall decrease in sales for the book industry as a whole after each selection was announced. Since Oprah's selections were longer and more difficult classics that demanded greater time and energy to read, those people who were reading Oprah's books were not buying their usual fare of genre books: "there were statistically significant decreases for mysteries and action/adventure novels. Romances also saw a sales decline," following an Oprah endorsement. In the 12 weeks following an endorsement, "weekly adult fiction book sales decreased by a statistically significant 2.5 percent."

Critical reception
The club has received critical commentaries from the literary community.

Scott Stossel, an editor at The Atlantic, wrote:

Controversies

Jonathan Franzen 
Jonathan Franzen felt conflicted about his book The Corrections being chosen as a book club selection. After the announcement was made, he expressed distaste with being in the company of other Oprah's Book Club authors, saying in an interview that Winfrey had "picked some good books, but she's picked enough schmaltzy, one-dimensional ones that I cringe, myself, even though I think she's really smart and she's really fighting the good fight." Franzen added that his novel was a "hard book for that audience."

Following the criticism Franzen was uninvited from the televised book club dinner, and he apologized profusely. When Franzen was not invited back, he suggested that perhaps he and Winfrey could still have dinner but not on TV, but Winfrey was all booked up, and her spokesperson said she was moving on.

Other writers were critical of Franzen. Writing in The New York Times, author Verlyn Klinkenborg suggested that "lurking behind Mr. Franzen's rejection of Ms. Winfrey is an elemental distrust of readers, except for the ones he designates."  Author Andre Dubus III wrote that, "It is so elitist it offends me deeply. The assumption that high art is not for the masses, that they won't understand it and they don't deserve it – I find that reprehensible. Is that a judgment on the audience? Or on the books in whose company he would be?"

In 2010, Oprah chose another of Franzen's books, Freedom, for her book club.  She said that after she read a copy of the book Franzen had sent her with a note, she called the author and gained his permission.  Oprah said, "we have a little history this author and I", but called the book "a masterpiece", and according to an article in the Los Angeles Times, she "seems to have forgiven the bestselling author after their 2001 kerfuffle".

James Frey 

In late 2005 and early 2006, Oprah's Book Club was again involved in controversy. Winfrey selected James Frey's A Million Little Pieces for the September 2005 selection. Pieces is a book billed as a memoir—a true account of Frey's life as an alcoholic, drug addict, and criminal. It became the Book Club's greatest selling book up to that point, and many readers spoke of how the account helped free them from drugs as well. But the additional attention focused on Frey's memoir soon led to critics questioning the validity of Frey's supposedly true account, especially regarding his treatment while in a rehabilitation facility and his stories of time spent in jail. Initially, Frey convinced Larry King that the embellishments in his book were of a sort that could be found in any literary memoir; Winfrey encouraged debate about how creative non-fiction should be classified, and cited the inspirational impact Frey's work had had on so many of her viewers. But as more accusations against the book surfaced, Winfrey invited Frey on the show to find out directly from him whether he had lied to her and her viewers. During a heated live televised debate, Winfrey forced Frey to admit that he had indeed lied about spending time in jail, and that he had no idea whether he had two root canals without painkillers or not, despite devoting several pages to describing them in excruciating detail. Winfrey then brought out Frey's publisher Nan Talese to defend her decision to classify the book as a memoir, and forced Talese to admit that she had done nothing to check the book's veracity, despite the fact that her representatives had assured Winfrey's staff that the book was indeed non-fiction and described it as "brutally honest" in a press release.

The media commented on the televised showdown. David Carr of The New York Times wrote: "Both Mr. Frey and Ms. Talese were snapped in two like dry winter twigs." "Oprah annihilates Frey," proclaimed Larry King. New York Times columnist Maureen Dowd wrote, "It was a huge relief, after our long national slide into untruth and no consequences, into Swift boating and swift bucks, into W.'s delusion and denial, to see the Empress of Empathy icily hold someone accountable for lying," and The Washington Posts Richard Cohen was so impressed by the confrontation, that he crowned Winfrey "Mensch of the Year."

Oprah's Book Club selections

Source:

The original book club ended with the conclusion of The Oprah Winfrey Show in 2011. See Oprah's Book Club 2.0 for the selections of the club's 2012 relaunch.

Streaming television series

On March 25, 2019, Apple Inc. and Oprah announced a revival of Oprah's Book Club that was released on Apple TV+.

References

Footnotes

Further reading

External links
  at Oprah.com

Book Club
Book promotion
Television series segments